The IMOCA 60 Class yacht Budapest was designed and sailor Nandor Fa and launched in the 1996 and lost in 2018. What makes the boat rare is that it was designed by Nandor Fa the boats original skipper and owner.

Racing Results

Name / Ownership

Ending
The boat had a sad ending after the end of it life and was destroyed in 18 July 2018 off Saint Martin when the boat was set fire by the two crew sailing it and jump into the water as it was being surveillance at the time. They are recovered by customs officers who have also extinguished the fire (in two hours) and discover 1.5 tons of cocaine.

References 

1990s sailing yachts
Vendée Globe boats
IMOCA 60